The  is a railway line in the Tohoku and Chubu regions of Japan. Part of the East Japan Railway Company (JR East) system, it connects Niitsu Station in the city of Niigata and Akita Station in Akita. The name "Uetsu" refers to the ancient provinces of Dewa (出羽) and Echigo (越後), which the line connects.

Route data
Total length: 274.4 km (170.5 mi) (Fukushima–Aomori, Tsuchizaki–Akitakō)
Operators, distances: 
East Japan Railway Company (Services and tracks)
 Niitsu — Akita: 271.7 km (168.8 mi)
Japan Freight Railway Company (Services and tracks)
Sakata — Sakata-Minato: 2.7 km (1.7 mi)
Japan Freight Railway Company (Services)
 Niitsu — Akita: 271.7 km (168.8 mi)
Tracks:
See station list for details
Electrification:
 Niitsu — Murakami: 1,500 V DC
 Murakami — Akita: 20 kV AC, 50 Hz
Railway signalling: 
Maximum speed:
 Niitsu — Murakami: 120 km/h (75 mph)
 Murakami — Imagawa: 100 km/h (62 mph)
 Imagawa — Sanze: 95 km/h (59 mph)
 Sanze — Sakata: 120 km/h (75 mph)
 Sakata — Akita: 95 km/h (59 mph)

Services
Limited express, Rapid
, the following services are operated.

Local
Niitsu – Shibata: every 60-180 minutes 
Shibata – Murakami: every 60-120 minutes
Murakami – Sakata: every 60-180 minutes
Sakata – Akita: every 60-180 minutes

Between Shibata and Murakami, most of the local trains travel through to/from  via Hakushin Line.

Stations
A: Limited Express Inaho
B: Rapid Kairi
C: Rapid Rakuraku Train Murakami, Benibana and other Rapid service trains
Trains stop at stations marked "O", skip at stations marked "|".

Symbols: 
 | - Single-track
 ◇ - Single-track; station where trains can pass
 ^ - Double-track section starts from this point 
 ∥ - Double-track
 ∨ - Single-track section starts from this point

Rolling stock

Present

Local
 E129 series 2/4-car DC EMUs (Niitsu—Murakami, since December 2014)
 701 series 2/3-car AC EMUs (Sakata—Akita)
 KiHa 110 series (Niitsu - Nezugaseki)
 GV-E400 series (Niitsu-Sakata, since August 2019)

Inaho/Rakuraku Train Murakami
 E653-1000 series 7-car DC/AC EMUs (since September 2013)

Kairi
 HB-E300 series

Former
 115 series DC EMUs (Niitsu—Murakami, until March 2018)
 E127-0 series 2-car DC EMUs (Shibata—Murakami, until March 2015)
 KiHa 40/47/48 series DMUs (Until March 2020)
 KiHa E120 DMUs (Niitsu—Sakata, until March 2018)
 KiHa 58 series DMUs
 KiHa 52 DMUs
 485 series DC/AC EMUs (until July 2014) - Inaho, Hakucho, Rakuraku Train Murakami

History
The line was opened in sections between 1912 and 1924, and electrified in 1972, the same year CTC signalling was commissioned.

Work to double-track the line in sections commenced in 1957, and continued for 25 years until being suspended due to capital expenditure restrictions in 1983, at which time 51% of the route was double-tracked.

Accidents
The train was headed south towards Kita-Amarume Station. Three of the cars turned over, causing the deaths of five people and injuring 33 others. Three other persons were originally reported missing, but authorities later discovered that they had disembarked from the train before the accident. It is likely that the event was caused by a tornado although it is uncertain whether or not a tornado was involved with this accident.

References

External links
 Inaho - JR East 
 Kairi - JR East 
 Discover Uetsu, tourist website 

 
Lines of East Japan Railway Company
Rail transport in Niigata Prefecture
Rail transport in Yamagata Prefecture
Rail transport in Akita Prefecture
1067 mm gauge railways in Japan
Standard gauge railways in Japan
Railway lines opened in 1912
1912 establishments in Japan